The Filthiest Show in Town is a 2007 studio album by industrial disco band My Life with the Thrill Kill Kult.

Recording
The Filthiest Show in Town was the band's second album recorded for Rykodisc. It was recorded and mixed at Starlust Studios, Los Angeles. It was mastered at The Boiler Room, Chicago.

Release
The Filthiest Show in Town was released on CD by Rykodisc in the UK, US, and Europe in 2007.

Touring
The band toured the U.S. in support of the album from November to December 2007. The live lineup of the Filthiest Show Tour included Groovie Mann, Buzz McCoy, Justin Thyme, Levi Levi, and Pepper Somerset.

Track listing

Credits
 Artwork – McCoy, Mann
 Directed By – Groovie Mann
 Mastered By – Collin Jordan
 Performer – The Bomb Gang Girlz, Thrill Kill Kult
 Producer – Buzz McCoy
 Written-By – Buzz McCoy, Groovie Mann

References

External links

2007 albums
My Life with the Thrill Kill Kult albums